Michael Nickolas Graham Sr. (April 3, 1923 – July 7, 2003) was an American football player who played at the fullback and halfback positions on both offense and defense. He played college football for Cincinnati and professional football for the Los Angeles Dons.

Early years
Graham was born in 1923 in Warren, Ohio. He attended and played football at Warren G. Harding High School in Warren.

Military and college football
He played college football for the University of Cincinnati Bearcats in 1942, 1946, and 1947. He played at the fullback and halfback positions on offense and also on defense. He became known as the "Greek Ground Gripper" for his ability to remain on his feet while opponents tried to tackle him. His college career was interrupted by service in the United States Navy during World War II.

Professional football
In January 1948, Graham announced that he would not be returning to Cincinnati for the 1948 season. He signed to play professional football with the Los Angeles Dons of the All-America Football Conference in July 1948. during their 1948 season. He also played for the Erie Vets of the American Football League in 1950.

Family and later years
He died in 2003 at age 80 in Warren, Ohio.

References

1923 births
2003 deaths
Los Angeles Dons players
Cincinnati Bearcats football players
Players of American football from Ohio
Sportspeople from Warren, Ohio
United States Navy personnel of World War II